Transcend into Ferocity is the second studio album from Swedish death metal band Visceral Bleeding.

Track listing

"Merely Parts Remain" - 3:24
"Fed to the Dogs" 3:04
"Indulge in Self Mutilation" - 3:15
"Fury Unleashed" - 3:18
"Trephine the Malformed" - 3:16
"All Flesh..." - 2:57
"Clenched Fist Obedience" - 3:11
"Fire Took His Face" 2:45
"When Pain Came to Town" - 3:29

Line-Up
Dennis Röndum - Vocals
Peter Persson - Guitar
Marcus Nilsson - Lead Guitar
Calle Löfgren - Bass
Tobbe Persson - Drums

Visceral Bleeding albums
2004 albums